Bullina lineata, common name the red-lined bubble snail, is a species of sea snail, a marine gastropod mollusc in the family Aplustridae.

Description
This snail has a milky-white mantle with iridescent blue edges. There are small black eyes on the head between the head shield processes. The shell has a white background with horizontally spiraling red brown bands which are crossed by vertical bands in the same color. The length is 15 to 25 mm.

Distribution
This species occurs in the sublittoral zone of the Indo-Pacific from Japan to Australia and New Zealand.

References

External links
 
 

Aplustridae
Gastropods described in 1822